Darker Days is third studio album by the Dutch progressive metal band Stream of Passion, released in 2011 on Napalm Records.

It is the first album with drummer Martijn Peters. All producing, engineering, mixing and mastering were made by former After Forever keyboardist Joost van den Broek.

Track listing
All songs written by Marcela Bovio, Johan van Stratum and Joost van den Broek except "The Mirror" by Stream of Passion and "Nadie Lo Ve" by Bovio and Jeffrey Revet

"Lost" - 5:27
"Reborn" - 3:37
"Collide" - 5:20
"The Scarlet Mark" - 3:41
"Spark" - 2:36
"Our Cause" - 4:43
"Darker Days" - 4:32
"Broken" - 4:47
"This Moment" - 3:55
"Closer" - 4:37
"The Mirror" - 3:34
"Nadie Lo Ve" - 3:04
"The World Is Ours" - 3:49
"The Hunt" (Digipack bonus track) - 4:28

Additional
During the interview with Valkryian music Marcela stated that Nadie Lo Ve's lyrics were inspired by the death of her grandmother, though the music to that song was written long before.

Personnel

Band members
Marcela Bovio - Lead Vocals; Violin
Eric Hazebroek - Lead/Rhythm Guitars
Stephan Schultz - Lead/Rhythm Guitars
Johan van Stratum - Bass
Jeffrey Revet - Keyboards; Piano
Martijn Peters - Drums

Additional musicians
Gert Wantenaar - bandoleon and accordion
Ben Mathot, Judith van Driel - violins
Mark Mulder - viola
David Faber - cello

Production
Joost van den Broek - producer, engineer, mixing, mastering, orchestral arrangements
Jeffrey Revet - orchestral arrangements

References

2011 albums
Stream of Passion albums
Napalm Records albums